Song dynasty coinage may refer to coins produced by the Chinese Song dynasty from the following periods:

 Coins from the Northern Song dynasty (960–1127).

 Coins from the Southern Song dynasty (1127–1279).